The Philippine fifty-centavo coin (50¢) was a denomination of Philippine currency. It was minted for the Philippines from 1864 to 1994 and was demonetized in 1998.

History

Spanish administration

Prior to 1864, coins valued at 1/2 a Spanish dollar (or peso) or four reales issued by Spain and Spanish America were generally accepted in the Philippines for half a peso. The half-peso coin was considered as the successor to the pre-Hispanic silver denomination rupee or rupiah, locally called salapi. In 1864 a silver 50-centimo coin was issued specifically for the Philippines weighing 12.98 grams of 0.9 fine silver (reduced to 0.835 fine after 1881).

United States administration

In 1903 the 50-centavo coin equivalent to 1/4th a U.S. dollar was minted for the Philippines, weighing 13.48 grams of 0.9 fine silver. Its specifications were reduced from 1907 to 10.0 grams of 0.75 fine silver; this was minted until 1945.

Independence
 English Series: In 1958, minting of the centavo resumed with another coat of arms on the reverse. The inscription around the coat of arms was changed to 'Central Bank of the Philippines'.
 Pilipino Series: In 1969, the coin featured the Tagalog language for the first time. Its obverse featured Marcelo H. del Pilar in profile to the left, a Filipino writer, lawyer, journalist, and freemason of the Philippine Revolution during the late 19th century. The inscription around the shield of the Coat of arms of the Philippines on its reverse read 'Republika ng Pilipinas', however, mintage of this coin was discontinued with the introduction of the Ang Bagong Lipunan Series.
1983: BSP reintroduces 50¢ coins as part of the Flora and Fauna Series. The coin has the profile of Marcelo del Pilar on the obverse and the Pithecophaga jefferyi (Philippine eagle) on the reverse.
1991: Improved Flora and Fauna Series, features the same designs on both the obverse and reverse, but was minted in brass instead of Copper-Nickel.
1995: The fifty-centavo coin was not included when the BSP Series was introduced.
1998: The 50¢ coin and other coins in the original Flora and Fauna and Improved Flora and Fauna Series was withdrawn, making the coin officially demonetized.

Version history

Errors
Some of the coins of the Flora and Fauna Series had an error; in the fifty-centavo coin, the text was "Pitecobhaga jefferyi" instead of "Pitecophaga jefferyi", It was later replaced by the Bangko Sentral ng Pilipinas.

References

Obsolete denominations of the Philippine peso
Philippines currency history
Fifty-cent coins